Lyndside is a rural locality in the Shire of Mareeba, Queensland, Australia.

Geography
The Lynd River flows through from south to north, where it forms part of the north-eastern boundary.

References 

Shire of Mareeba
Localities in Queensland